The 4th constituency of Somme is a French legislative constituency in the Somme département. Like the other 576 French constituencies, it elects one MP using the two-round system, with a run-off if no candidate receives over 50% of the vote in the first round.

Description

The 4th constituency of the Somme was radically altered as a result of the 2010 redistricting of French legislative constituencies and as a result is now completely different from the seat which bore the same name between 1988 and 2012. The new seat is closer in composition to the now defunct Somme's 6th constituency.

The constituency runs through the centre of the department but also includes a strip of territory along its southern edge. In its centre the seats surrounds the city of Amiens on three sides.

Notably the seat has changed hands at every election since 1988.

Historic Representation

Election results

2022

 
 
 
 
|-
| colspan="8" bgcolor="#E9E9E9"|
|-

2017

 
 
 
 
 
 
 
|-
| colspan="8" bgcolor="#E9E9E9"|
|-

2012

 
 
 
 
 
 
|-
| colspan="8" bgcolor="#E9E9E9"|
|-

2007

 
 
 
 
 
 
 
 
|-
| colspan="8" bgcolor="#E9E9E9"|
|-

2002

 
 
 
 
 
 
|-
| colspan="8" bgcolor="#E9E9E9"|
|-

1997

 
 
 
 
 
 
|-
| colspan="8" bgcolor="#E9E9E9"|
|-

Sources
Official results of French elections from 2002: "Résultats électoraux officiels en France" (in French).

4